Retrogenix is a biotechnology company based in the United Kingdom. Founded by Jim Freeth and Jo Soden in 2008, the company was acquired in April 2021 by Charles River Laboratories and is now known as the ‘High Peak’ site.

Research and development
The human Cell Microarray tool developed by Retrogenix utilises a library of expression vectors containing open reading frames (ORFs) encoding full-length human plasma membrane proteins, as well as a green fluorescent protein (GFP). Each vector is combined with a lipid and the complexes are spotted in precise locations on specialized slides. Reverse transfection of human cells which are grown on the microarray slides results in over-expression of each membrane protein located over its respective vector spot. Expression of GFP acts as a control to ensure transfection efficiency as well as confirming positioning of the spot co-ordinates. Putative receptor targets are identified by assessing gain-of-binding when a test ligand is applied to the cell microarrays. Further tests determine whether the receptor ‘hit’ is reproducible and to confirm specificity to the test ligand. 
Currently, more than 4,500 proteins are simultaneously expressed in the Cell Microarray system for individual screening.  The human expression system allows for correct folding and localisation at the surface of the cell and there are documented cases of biological interactions that are mediated by post-translational modifications being detected using the technology.

Applications in medical research
The Cell Microarray technology identifies targets and receptors that are important in the understanding of normal biological and disease processes. Diverse ligands can be screened using the technology which has led to the discovery of key receptors for malaria proteins and targets that mediate virus binding to human cells.

Target deconvolution
Cell Microarray screening identifies the receptors for biologic molecules that have been selected through phenotypic screening. Notably, in studies led by Medimmune, the technology identified disease-relevant cell surface antigens of promising phenotypic molecules  including the identification of TNFR2 as a potential target for cancer immunotherapy.

Off-target profiling
Cell Microarray off-target profiling assesses the specificity of ligands, either prior to clinical testing or to uncover the mechanism of action for an observed adverse event or an unexpected pharmacokinetic profile.

Awards
Retrogenix has twice won the Queen's Awards for Enterprise. The first award was granted for innovation in 2015.  This was followed by an award for international trade in 2017.

References

External links
 

Contract research organizations
2021 mergers and acquisitions